Kourtney Jean Keegan (born 7 September 1994) is an American former tennis player. Kourtney was born in Chicago, Illinois. She spent some of her youth in Jacksonville, FL before moving back to Chicago, before finally settling down in Roswell, GA throughout high school before going to the University of Florida to play tennis where she won a National Championship.

Keegan made her Grand Slam main draw debut at the 2016 US Open in the doubles event, partnering Brooke Austin.

She graduated from the University of Florida with a major in Sports Management in 2017, and currently resides in Jacksonville, serving as the tournament services coordinator for The Players Championship.

References

External links
 
 

1994 births
Living people
American female tennis players
Tennis players from Chicago
People from Roswell, Georgia
Florida Gators women's tennis players